Ne-Yo is an American singer, songwriter, and producer. While a teenager, he wrote songs for other artists, such as Youngstown and Mario, for whom he wrote "Let Me Love You". The song became "one of the most-played songs on urban radio stations across the U.S". Ne-Yo has released four studio albums: In My Own Words (2006), Because of You (2007), Year of the Gentleman (2008), and Libra Scale (2010). His debut album, In My Own Words, was released in early 2006 through Def Jam Recordings, and debuted at number one on Billboard 200. More than 301,000 copies were sold in the first week, and the album was certified Platinum by the Recording Industry Association of America after more than two million copies were sold in the United States and four million worldwide. His second album, Because of You, was released in May 2007, and its first single was "Because of You".

Ne-Yo has received several nominations at the Grammy Awards during his career; among these are Best Contemporary R&B Album for In My Own Words, Because of You and Year of the Gentleman, Album of the Year for Year of the Gentleman, Best Male R&B Vocal Performance for "So Sick", "Because of You" and "Miss Independent", Best Male Pop Vocal Performance for "Closer", Best R&B Performance by a Duo or Group for "Hate That I Love You" and Best R&B Song for "Hate That I Love You" and "Miss Independent". The MTV Video Music Awards has nominated Ne-Yo once, in 2008 for Best Dancing in a Video for "Closer". Ne-Yo has also received one award from six nominations at the BET Awards. Overall, Ne-Yo has received eight awards from 31 nominations.

Recently, Ne-Yo was honored with four awards at the 2009 ASCAP "Rhythm & Soul Awards". Ne-Yo took home awards for "Closer", "Take a Bow", "Miss Independent", and "Bust It Baby II".

American Music Awards 
The American Music Awards is an annual awards ceremony created by Dick Clark in 1973. Ne-Yo has received two nominations.

|-
|  ||rowspan=2| Ne-Yo ||rowspan=2| Favorite R&B/Soul Male Artist || 
|-
| ||

BET Awards 
The BET Awards were established in 2001 by the Black Entertainment Television (BET) network. Ne-Yo has received two awards from seven nominations.

|-
|rowspan="3"| 2006 ||rowspan="2"| Ne-Yo || Best New Artist || 
|-
| Best Male R&B Artist || 
|-
| "So Sick" ||rowspan=2| Viewer's Choice || 
|-
|rowspan=2| 2007 || "Because of You"  || 
|-
| rowspan=3|Ne-Yo ||rowspan=3| Best Male R&B Artist || 
|-
| 2008  || 
|-
| 2009  ||

BET Hip Hop Awards 
The BET Hip Hop Awards is an annual awards show hosted by BET. Ne-Yo has received four nominations.

|-
| 2007 || "Make Me Better" (with Fabolous) || Best Hip-Hop Collabo || 
|-
| rowspan="3"| 2008 || rowspan="3"| "Bust It Baby Pt. 2"|| Ringtone of the Year || 
|-
| People's Champ Award || 
|-
| Best Collaboration ||

Billboard R&B/Hip-Hop Awards 
The Billboard R&B/Hip-Hop Awards is sponsored by Billboard magazine, is one of several United States music awards shows (among the others are the Grammy Awards and the American Music Awards).

|-
| 2006 || Ne-Yo || Top R&B/Hip-Hop Artist ||

Grammy Awards 
The Grammy Awards are awarded annually by the National Academy of Recording Arts and Sciences. Ne-Yo has won three awards from 15 nominations.

|-
|rowspan="2"|2007
|"So Sick"
|Best Male R&B Vocal Performance
|
|-
||In My Own Words
|Best Contemporary R&B Album
|
|-
|rowspan="5"|2008
|"Because of You"
|Best Male R&B Vocal Performance
|
|-
|"Irreplaceable" (as a producer)
|Record of the Year
|
|-
|rowspan="2"|"Hate That I Love You"  (with Rihanna) 
|Best R&B Performance by a Duo or Group with Vocals
|
|-
|Best R&B Song
|
|-
||Because of You
|Best Contemporary R&B Album
|
|-
|rowspan="6"|2009
|rowspan="2"|Year of the Gentleman
|Album of the Year
|
|-
|Best Contemporary R&B Album
|
|-
|"Closer"
|Best Male Pop Vocal Performance
|
|-
|rowspan="2"|"Miss Independent"
|Best Male R&B Vocal Performance
|
|-
|rowspan="2"|Best R&B Song
|
|-
|"Spotlight"
|
|-
||2010
||"Knock You Down"  (with Keri Hilson and Kanye West) 
|Best Rap/Sung Collaboration
|
|-
||2013
||"Let's Go"  (with Calvin Harris) 
|Best Dance Recording
|
|-
||2023
||Good Morning Gorgeous (Deluxe)
|Album of the Year
|

MOBO Awards 
The MOBO Awards is an awards ceremony established in 1995 by Kanya King. Ne-Yo has received two awards from eight nominations.

|-
|rowspan=3| 2006 || "So Sick" || Best Song || 
|-
|rowspan=2| Ne-Yo || Best International Male || 
|-
| Best R&B Act || 
|-
|rowspan=2| 2007 || "Because of You" || Best Song || 
|-
| rowspan=4|Ne-Yo || Best R&B || 
|-
|rowspan=2| 2008 ||  Best R&B/Soul || 
|-
|rowspan=2| Best International Act || 
|-
| 2010 ||

MTV Video Music Awards 
The MTV Video Music Awards is an annual awards ceremony established in 1984 by MTV. Ne-Yo has received four nominations.

|-
| rowspan="2"|  || rowspan="2"| "Closer" || Best Dancing in a Video || 
|-
| Best Editing || 
|-
|  || "Miss Independent" || Best Male Video || 
|-
|  || "Give Me Everything" || Best Collaboration ||

MTV Video Music Awards Japan 

|-
| rowspan="2"| 2007 ||rowspan="2"| So Sick || Best New Artist Video || 
|-
| Best R&B Video || 
|-
| rowspan="3"| 2008 ||rowspan=2| Because of You || Album of the Year || 
|-
| rowspan="2"|  Best Male Video || 
|-
| Best Karaokee Song || 
|-
| rowspan="3"| 2009 || Year of the Gentleman || Album of the Year || 
|-
| Closer || Best Male Video || 
|-
|Miss Independent ||rowspan=2| Best R&B Video || 
|-
| 2011 || Champagne Life||

People's Choice Awards 

|-
| 2016 || Ne-Yo || Favorite R&B Artist || 
|}

Soul Train Music Awards 
The Soul Train Music Awards is an annual awards show that honors black musicians and entertainers. Ne-Yo has received one award from five nominations.

|-
|rowspan="2"| 2007 || Ne-Yo || Best R&B/Soul or Rap New Artist || 
|-
| "Sexy Love" || Best R&B/Soul Male Single || 
|-
|rowspan="3"| 2009 ||rowspan="2"| "Knock You Down" || Record of the Year || 
|-
| Best Collaboration|| 
|-
| Year of the Gentleman || Album of the Year||

References 

Ne-Yo
Awards